Plain dress is a practice among some religious groups, primarily some Christian churches in which people dress in clothes of traditional modest design, sturdy fabric, and conservative cut. It is intended to show acceptance of traditional gender roles, modesty, and readiness to work and serve, and to preserve communal identity and separation from the immodest, ever-changing fashions of the world. For men, this often takes the form of trousers secured by suspenders, while for women, plain dress usually takes the form of a cape dress along with a headcovering (normatively a kapp or an opaque hanging veil).

History 

Practicing groups 

The practice is generally found among the following Anabaptist branches: Amish (Old Order Amish, New Order Amish, Kauffman Amish Mennonites, Beachy Amish Mennonites), Para-Amish (Believers in Christ, Vernon Community, Caneyville Christian Community), Mennonites (Old Order Mennonites, Conservative Mennonites, traditional "Russian" Mennonites), Hutterites, the Bruderhof, Schwarzenau Brethren (Old Brethren, Old German Baptist Brethren, New Conference, Dunkard Brethren), and River Brethren (Old Order River Brethren and Calvary Holiness Church). Plain dress is also practiced by Conservative Friends and Holiness Friends (Quakers), in which it is part of their testimony of simplicity, as well as Old Regular Baptists, Plymouth Brethren, Cooperites and fundamentalist Mormon subgroups.

Among traditional Anabaptist groups, plain dress is an expression of their beliefs regarding modesty and veiling, as well as nonconformity to the world—which they see as consistent with the Bible and teachings of the early Church Fathers. Plain, simple and serviceable gender-identifying dress is governed by an unwritten code of conduct, called "ordnung" among Anabaptists, which is strictly adhered to by Amish, Old Order Mennonites, and conservative Brethren.

Many Apostolic Lutherans also wear plain dress.

Members of the Moravian Church traditionally wore plain dress.

Historically, Methodists were known for wearing plain dress, a tradition carried on by those in the conservative holiness movement, such as communicants of the Allegheny Wesleyan Methodist Connection and Evangelical Wesleyan Church, as well as some Holiness Pentecostal denominations in the Wesleyan-Arminian tradition. The Church of God (Restoration) also observes plain dress.

Adventists wear plain dress as taught by the founder of that faith Ellen White, who asked that they "adopt a simple, unadorned dress of modest length". The Church Manual of the Seventh-day Adventist Church teaches "To dress plainly, and abstain from display of jewelry and ornaments of every kind is in keeping with our faith." Adherents of the Seventh-day Adventist Church have historically not worn wedding rings.

Other groups adhering to a conservative dress code include Buddhist and Christian monks, Orthodox Jews, and more conservative  Muslims such as Sufis, but these forms of dress normally are not called "plain dress".

Practices 
Plain dress is attributed to reasons of theology and sociology. In general, plain dress involves the covering of much of the body (often including the head, forearms and calves), with minimal ornamentation, rejecting jewelry and sometimes print fabrics, trims, and fasteners. Non-essential elements of garments such as neckties, collars, and lapels may be minimized or omitted. Practical garments such as aprons and shawls may be layered over the basic ensemble. Plain dress garments are often handmade and may be produced by groups of women in the community for efficiency and to ensure uniformity of style. Plain dress practices can extend to the grooming of hair and beards and may vary somewhat to allow children and older people more latitude.

Within these general practices, distinctions abound. Among some groups, the headcovering worn by females is lacy or translucent; in others, it must be opaque.

Anabaptist 
The traditional plain dress worn by the Anabaptists and other religious groups has long sleeves with a set waist, long skirt, and no adornment. It denotes "utility, modesty, long wear and inconspicuousness", does not display any trademark, and is not dictated by fashion trends. Shawl, aprons, bonnets and cap are part of plain dress.

Clothing worn by Bruderhof women includes a headcovering, as well as long skirts or dresses; men wear contemporary clothes of a modest nature.

Quaker 
As a part of their testimony of simplicity, Quakers (Religious Society of Friends) traditionally wore plain dress; "Ruffles and lace and other forms of ornamentation, as well as unnecessary cuffs and collars and lapels and buttons, were forbidden." George Fox implored fellow Quakers to wear plain dress:

This classical Quaker belief practice continues to be maintained by Conservative Friends, as well as the Holiness Friends. For Conservative Friends, plain dress for men usually includes "a broad-brimmed felt or straw hat, trousers with suspenders instead of a belt, and muted colors in the fabrics: blacks, whites, greys, browns", sometimes with "broad-fall trouser cuts". Quaker men traditionally are clean-shaven. Conservative Quaker women practice headcovering by wearing a "scarf, bonnet, or cap" and "wear long-sleeved, long dresses".

Methodist 

Early Methodists wore plain dress, with Methodist clergy condemning "high headdresses, ruffles, laces, gold, and 'costly apparel' in general". John Wesley, the founder of the Methodist movement, recommended that Methodists read his thoughts On Dress, in which he detailed acceptable types and colors of fabrics, in addition to "shapes and sizes of hats, coats, sleeves, and hairstyles"; in that sermon, John Wesley expressed his desire for Methodists: "Let me see, before I die, a Methodist congregation, full as plain dressed as a Quaker congregation." He also taught, with respect to headcovering, that women, "especially in a religious assembly", should "keep on her veil". Those who tried to attend Methodist services in costly apparel were denied admittance. The 1858 Discipline of the Wesleyan Methodist Connection stated that "we would not only enjoin on all who fear God plain dress, but we would recommend to our preachers and people, according to Mr. Wesley's views expressed in his sermon on the inefficiency of Christianity, published but a few years before his death, and containing his matured judgment, distinguishing plainness—Plainness which will publicly comment them to the maintenance of their Christian profession wherever they may be." The 1859 novel Adam Bede portrayed the Methodist itinerant preacher, Dinah Morris, wearing plain dress, with the words "I saw she was a Methodist, or Quaker, or something of that sort, by her dress". Peter Cartwright, a Methodist revivalist, lamented the decline of wearing plain dress among Methodists, stating:

While few wear plain dress in mainline Methodism today, Methodist Churches of the conservative holiness movement, such as the Allegheny Wesleyan Methodist Connection and Evangelical Wesleyan Church, continue to dress plainly, also avoiding the wearing of jewelry (inclusive of wedding rings). The Fellowship of Independent Methodist Churches, which continues to observe the ordinance of women's headcovering, stipulates "renouncing all vain pomp and glory" and "adorning oneself with modest attire."

Moravian 
Historically, members of the Moravian Church wore plain dress:

Theological bases 

Plain dressing Christians cite Paul's advice to the Romans, "Be not conformed to this world," as one Biblical basis for their distinctive dress. Other scripture passages counsel women to wear head coverings while praying, not to cut their hair, and for men not to shave or cut their beards. 

The rejection of extravagant clothing is further established in :

Some Mormon Fundamentalist groups such as the FLDS wear plain dress, referring both to Biblical and unique Latter Day Saint Scriptures, such as the Book of Alma and the Doctrine and Covenants, which states, "Thou shalt not be proud in thy heart; let all thy garments be plain, and their beauty of the work of thine own hands" (42:40).

Social effects 

Plain dress may establish a sense of belonging within the community while also marking the group's members as different in the wider society. Some practitioners describe their dress as a protection from unwanted attention. Quaker minister Elizabeth Fry considered her plain dress to serve as "a hedge against the world", and "a sort of protector". Marketing through the internet has these sites which propagate plain dress: "Quaker Jane", "Plain and Simple Headcoverings", "Rachel's Seamstress Services" and "Mennonite Maidens".

Simple dress, considered "sensible and useful" and necessary, is sometimes hard to find as the clothing market is dictated by fashion conscious people who consider plain dress dull.

In literature 
Dressing heroines in Victorian literature in plain dress is often assumed to be a way of making characters appear classless and sexless. Others argue that authors like Charlotte Brontë, George Eliot, and Anthony Trollope use plain dress to highlight the marriageability of the character, sexualizing her by emphasizing the female body within. Additionally, plain dress may signify a character's rejection of societal norms and willingness to leave the household to act on her desires.

Gallery

See also 

 Plain people
 Cape dress
 Prairie dress
 Journeyman uniform in Germany
 Normcore
 Modest fashion
 Sufism
 Tazkiyah

References

Further reading

External links 
Understanding Plain Dress (Mennonite)
Plain Resources (Quaker)
On Dress by John Wesley  (Methodist)
fldsdress (Mormon Fundamentalist, archived)

Anabaptism
Clothing by function
Methodism
Modesty in Christianity
Simple living